Statistics of the Scottish Football League in season 1937–38.

Scottish League Division One

Scottish League Division Two

See also
1937–38 in Scottish football

 
Scottish Football League seasons